Bajerov is a village and municipality in Prešov District in the Prešov Region of eastern Slovakia.

Population 
It has a population of about 437 people (2020-12-31).

Genealogical resources

The records for genealogical research are available at the state archive "Statny Archiv in Presov, Slovakia"

 Roman Catholic church records (births/marriages/deaths): 1798-1896 (parish A)
 Greek Catholic church records (births/marriages/deaths): 1825-1897
 Census records 1869 of Bajerov are available at the state archive.

See also
 List of municipalities and towns in Slovakia

References

External links
 
 
Surnames of living people in Bajerov

Villages and municipalities in Prešov District
Šariš